Tupou Paea'i Okalani Vaa'i (born 27 January 2000) is a New Zealand professional rugby union footballer who plays as a lock for the Taranaki Bulls in the Mitre 10 Cup and for the Chiefs in Super Rugby.

Career

Early career
In his youth career, he played for the Wesley College first XV and was Head Prefect, captaining the team in his last year of school. Vaa'i went on to play for the top representative team in secondary school, and was selected to play in the 2019 World Rugby Under 20 Championships for New Zealand.

Vaa'i debuted for Taranaki as an 18-year-old against Auckland, in 2018 His Chiefs debut came in 2020, when the team was short on locks, having lost Michael Allardice and Laghlan McWhannell to season-ending injuries. Although Vaa'i was not originally contracted to the team at the start of 2020, he was promoted to a starting role following an injury to Naitoa Ah Kuoi. Vaa'i was one of the Chiefs' better performers in their winless Super Rugby Aotearoa season and was named in the North Island team, for New Zealand's 2020 North vs South rugby union match.

In September 2020 Vaa'i was named in Ian Foster's first ever All Blacks squad. 

Vaa'i debuted for New Zealand on 11 October 2020, replacing Patrick Tuipulotu off the bench, in the 75th minute, in a 16-16 draw against Australia. Vaa'i became the first player born in the 21st century to represent New Zealand in international rugby.

The following week, with Sam Whitelock ruled out due to concussion symptoms, Vaa'i made his first start for New Zealand, with the All Blacks going on to beat Australia 27-7. Following Tuipulotu's illness ahead of Bledisloe IV a fortnight later, Vaa'i was restored to the matchday 23, accompanying debutants Will Jordan, Asafo Aumua, and Cullen Grace on the bench. He scored his debut test try shortly after coming on, in the 78th minute. Vaa'i ended the 2020 season having played four tests for his country.

2021
Vaa'i became a regular starter for the Chiefs in 2021, finishing the season with a total of 19 Super Rugby caps. He played for the team in the Super Rugby Aotearoa final, which was lost to the Crusaders by 13-24.  

He did not feature in the 2021 mid-year tests due to injury, but played three tests for New Zealand during the 2021 Rugby Championship. Vaa'i was used as a replacement off the bench in wins over Argentina and Australia, before starting his first test of the year on 18th September. This was a 36-13 win against Argentina, where Vaa'i played all 80 minutes of the match and scored two tries.

Statistics 

Updated: 12 June 2022
Source: Tupou P O Vaa'i Rugby History

List of international test tries 

Updated: 21 June 2021
Source: Tupou P O Vaa'i Statsguru

References

External links
 
 Tupou Vaa'i at All Blacks.com

2000 births
Living people
New Zealand rugby union players
Rugby union locks
Rugby union players from Auckland
Taranaki rugby union players
Chiefs (rugby union) players
New Zealand international rugby union players